Maytenus harrisii is a species of plant in the family Celastraceae. It is endemic to Jamaica. It is a tree and grows primarily in the wet tropical biome.

References

harrisii
Critically endangered plants
Endemic flora of Jamaica
Taxonomy articles created by Polbot
Taxobox binomials not recognized by IUCN